This is a list of Brazilian state-owned federal companies.

Brazilian government enterprises

See also

Federal institutions of Brazil
 List of government-owned companies

References

Government enterprises

Brazil